Left by Soft is a studio album by David Kilgour and the Heavy Eights. It was released in April 2011 under Merge Records. In 2011, the album debuted on the NZ Top 40 at #31.

Track list

References

2011 albums
Merge Records albums